Joculator minimus is a species of minute sea snail, a marine gastropod mollusc in the family Cerithiopsidae. The species was described by Laseron in 1956.

Distribution
This marine species occurs off Southern Madagascar and off Queensland, Australia.

References

 Laseron, C. F. (1956). The family Cerithiopsidae (Mollusca) from the Solanderian and Dampierian zoogeographical provinces. Australian Journal of Marine and Freshwater Research. 7 (1): 151–182.

Gastropods described in 1956
minimus